

Wilfrith or Wilfrid was a medieval Bishop of Worcester. He was consecrated in 718. 

In 735, he consecrated one Eva as the third abbess of Gloucester Abbey. Wilfrith died between 743 and 745, perhaps on 29 April 744.

Citations

References

External links
 

Bishops of Worcester
8th-century English bishops
743 deaths